Geng may refer to:

Geng (dish) (羹), a thick soup
Geng (surname) (耿), a Chinese surname
Norbert Geng (born 1965), German lawyer and professor
21359 Geng, an asteroid
Gen.G, an esports organisation